is a former Japanese football referee. He refereed a first round match between Spain and Algeria in the 1986 FIFA World Cup. He also officiated a first round match between Yugoslavia and UAE in the 1990 FIFA World Cup.

References
Profile

External links
Japan Football Hall of Fame at Japan Football Association

1947 births
Living people
Japanese footballers
Japan Soccer League players
Japanese football referees
FIFA World Cup referees
1990 FIFA World Cup referees
1986 FIFA World Cup referees
Olympic football referees
Association footballers not categorized by position
AFC Asian Cup referees